Early pregnancy bleeding (also called first trimester bleeding) refers to vaginal bleeding before 14 weeks of gestational age. If the bleeding is significant, hemorrhagic shock may occur. Concern for shock is increased in those who have loss of consciousness, chest pain, shortness of breath, or shoulder pain.

Common causes of early pregnancy bleeding include ectopic pregnancy, threatened miscarriage, and pregnancy loss. Most miscarriages occur before 12 weeks gestation age. Other causes include implantation bleeding, gestational trophoblastic disease, polyps, and cervical cancer. Tests to determine the underlying cause usually include a speculum examination, ultrasound, and hCG.

Treatment depends on the underlying cause. If tissue is seen at the cervical opening it should be removed. For those in whom the pregnancy is intrauterine and who have fetal heart sounds, watchful waiting is generally appropriate. Anti-D immune globulin is usually recommended in those who are Rh-negative. Occasionally, surgery is required.

About 30% of women have bleeding in the first trimester (0 to 14 weeks gestational age). Bleeding in the second trimester (12 to 24 weeks gestational age) is less common. About 15% of those who realize they are pregnant have a miscarriage. Ectopic pregnancy occurs in under 2% of pregnancies.

Differential diagnosis 
The differential diagnosis depends on whether the bleeding occurs in the first trimester or in the second or third trimesters.

Obstetric causes of first trimester bleeding include the following:

Early pregnancy loss is a term often used interchangeably with spontaneous abortion and miscarriage and refers to pregnancy loss during the first trimester. It is the most common cause of early pregnancy bleeding and is associated only with heavy (versus light) bleeding. However, patients typically remain hemodynamically stable.
Threatened early pregnancy loss, often considered a type of early pregnancy loss, refers vaginal bleeding in the presence of an intrauterine pregnancy and a closed cervix. The presence of fetal heart rate largely determines whether the pregnancy will progress to a viable outcome.
Ectopic pregnancy refers to a pregnancy outside the uterus, commonly in the fallopian tube. It is a less common but more serious cause of early pregnancy bleeding. Ectopic pregnancies can rupture, leading to internal bleeding that can be fatal if untreated.
Implantation bleeding involves a small amount of bleeding that may occur 10 to 14 days after implantation of the fertilized egg. However, there is little evidence to support the existence of such bleeding.
Chorionic hematoma is the pooling of blood (hematoma) between the chorion, a membrane surrounding the embryo, and the uterine wall. It occurs in about 3.1% of all pregnancies and is the most common cause of first trimester bleeding.
Gestational trophoblastic neoplasia, which refers to pregnancy-related tumors that be either cancerous or non-cancerous. This cause is extremely rare with non-cancerous gestational trophoblastic neoplasia found in 23 to 1,299 cases per 100,000 pregnancies and cancerous forms with a 10-fold lower incidence.

Obstetric causes of second/third trimester bleeding include the following:

Bloody show refers to the passage of a small amount of blood or blood-tinged mucus resulting from labor or cervical weakness.
Pregnancy loss refers to death of the fetus at any time during pregnancy. Pregnancy loss most commonly occurs during the first trimester, when it is referred to as early pregnancy loss.
Placenta praevia or vasa praevia refers to the placenta or fetal blood vessels, respectively, covering or being located close to the opening of the uterus. More than half of women affected by placenta praevia (51.6)% have bleeding before delivery. Vasa praevia occurs in about 0.6 per 1000 pregnancies.
Placental abruption involves the separation of the placental lining from the uterus of the mother. It occurs most commonly around 25 weeks of pregnancy.
Uterine rupture is when the muscular wall of the uterus tears during childbirth or, less commonly, during pregnancy.
Nontubal ectopic pregnancy refers to an ectopic pregnancy that occurs in the ovary, cervix, or intra-abdominal cavity.

Other causes of early pregnancy bleeding include the following:

Postcoital bleeding, which is vaginal bleeding after sexual intercourse that can be normal with pregnancy.
 Iatrogenic causes, or bleeding due to medical treatment or intervention, such as sex steroids, anticoagulants, or intrauterine contraceptive devices.
Vaginal or cervical bleeding, which may arise from many causes including fibroids, polyps, warts, tumors, vaginitis, or trauma. Importantly, these causes may co-occur with other causes of early pregnancy bleeding.
Lower genitourinary tract bleeding, which may result from a urinary tract infection (UTI), strenuous exercise, or bladder cancer.

Pathophysiology 
Early pregnancy bleeding is usually from a maternal source rather than a fetal one. The maternal source may be a disruption in the vessels of the decidua or a lesion in the cervix or vagina. In the earlier stages of pregnancy, the cervix can be vulnerable to bleeding as new blood vessels are being grown. Vasa praevia is a rare condition that can result in bleeding from the fetoplacental circulation. Vasa praevia happens most often when the umbilical cord grows in a way that it directly enters the membrane, and therefore blood vessels that are unprotected by the umbilical cord or placental tissue can rupture and lead to bleeding. Another common source of bleeding can be due to abnormal development of the embryo. The most common early fetal abnormality is abnormal number of chromosomes causing loss of the pregnancy and bleeding.

Diagnostic approach 
The initial assessment of vaginal bleeding in early pregnancy must first consider hemodynamic stability and the degree of pain or bleeding.  A hemodynamically unstable individual would necessitate an immediate transfer to the emergency department. It is important to recognize that women may suffer significant blood loss before any signs of hemodynamic instability are evident.

The initial evaluation of early pregnancy bleeding involves a history and physical examination. The relevant history includes determining the gestational age of fetus and characterizing the bleeding. Bleeding that is at least as heavy as menstrual bleeding or associated with clots, tissue, lightheadedness, or pelvic discomfort is associated with increased risks of ectopic pregnancy and spontaneous abortion. Discomfort in the middle of the abdomen is more closely associated with spontaneous abortion; discomfort on a side of the abdomen is more closely associated with ectopic pregnancy. Risk factors for ectopic pregnancy or spontaneous abortion should also be considered.

The physical examination includes assessing vital signs and performing an abdominal and pelvic examination. Signs of hemodynamic instability or peritonitis require emergent intervention. A pelvic examination may reveal non-obstetric causes of bleeding such as bleeding from the vagina or cervix. It may also show visible products of conception suggestive of an incomplete abortion.

If the person is stable and a pelvic exam is unrevealing, transvaginal ultrasonography and/or serial measurement of hCG is generally recommended to assess fetal location and viability. Reviewed data from observational studies determined that ultrasound examination and hCG concentration could replace pelvic examination in the initial evaluation of early pregnancy bleeding. Transvaginal ultrasound is frequently used in the evaluation of bleeding in early pregnancy.

Before 10 weeks gestation, a slower than normal increase in hCG suggests early pregnancy loss or ectopic pregnancy. By approximately 10 weeks, hCG plateaus and ultrasound is preferred to determine the location of the pregnancy (i.e., intrauterine or ectopic). In the presence of prior pelvic imaging, fetal heart tracing with Doppler sonography is sufficient to assess fetal viability beginning at 10–12 weeks of gestation. Bleeding associated with an intrauterine, viable pregnancy suggests threatened early pregnancy loss. Bleeding associated with an intrauterine, nonviable pregnancy suggests early pregnancy loss. If the viability of an intrauterine pregnancy is uncertain, repeat ultrasonography coupled with laboratory measurement of progesterone and/or serial hCG can be helpful. The absence of either intrauterine or ectopic pregnancy on imaging is suggestive of a complete early pregnancy loss (if the pregnancy was previously seen on imaging) or a pregnancy of unknown location (if the pregnancy was not previously seen on imaging).

Management 
The management of early pregnancy bleeding depends on its severity and cause.

Women with significant first-trimester bleeding (more than spotting) should have a red blood cell antibody screen. Women who are Rh-negative are usually given anti-D immune globulin to prevent RhD isoimmunization. Those with significant blood loss who become hemodynamically unstable require rapid intervention.

Early pregnancy loss can be treated with watchful waiting, medication, or uterine aspiration based on shared decision-making between the mother and provider. For those with incomplete abortion, watchful waiting is the recommended method as more than 90% of these individuals will complete the process spontaneously within four week. Women who decide on expectant management may experience more days of bleeding and longer completion time as compared to surgical management. Serious complications of watchful waiting are rare. Effective medical management entails 200 mg of oral mifepristone (Mifeprex) followed 24 hours later by 800 mcg of vaginally administered misoprostol. Bed rest and progesterone therapy have not been shown to increase the likelihood of a viable outcome.

Ectopic pregnancy is treated with methotrexate therapy or surgery. Typically, an intramuscular injection of 50 mg per m^2 of methotrexate is given followed by close monitoring of b-hCG levels 4 and 7 days after injection. B-hCG levels should decrease by at least 15% between those two timepoints. Surgery is required for individuals who have failed or have contraindications to methotrexate therapy, are experiencing significant blood loss, or have signs of ectopic rupture.

Epidemiology 
First trimester bleeding is more common than second or third trimester bleeding. First trimester bleeding may be associated with complications in later pregnancy, including placental abruption, smaller estimated fetal weight, stillbirth, and perinatal death.

References  

Wikipedia medicine articles ready to translate
Human pregnancy
Miscarriage